The Prince George Fury were a Canadian Major Indoor Soccer League team, located in Prince George, British Columbia.

History 
On October 14, 2009 the CMISL announced that a new expansion club will join the league in 2010 in the form of the Prince George Fury.

Year-by-Year

Players

Staff 
John Mehrassa - Co-owner/Chairman
Sergio DeBianchi - Co-owner
Sipho Sibiya - Head Coach
Brad Stewart - Assistant Coach
Sonny Pawar - Assistant Coach

References

Defunct Professional Arena Soccer League teams
Soccer clubs in British Columbia
Canadian Major Indoor Soccer League teams
2009 establishments in British Columbia
2010 disestablishments in British Columbia
Association football clubs established in 2009
Association football clubs disestablished in 2010